is a Japanese manga series written by Akinari Asakura and illustrated by Takeshi Obata. It follows high school students Azemichi Shijimi and Taiyo Higashikata as they aim to become the best comedy duo in Japan. Show-ha Shoten! has been serialized monthly in Shueisha's Jump Square magazine since October 2021, with the chapters collected into four tankōbon volumes as of February 2023. Viz Media has licensed the series for English release in North America.

Plot
Shy high school student Azemichi Shijimi and former child actor Taiyo Higashikata both love comedy. After learning that Azemichi is a skilled and famous anonymous joke writer, Taiyo tricks him into being his partner in a sketch comedy routine for their school's cultural festival. The sketch is a hit, with the two winning the award for best performance. Realizing that each excels in the area where the other is weak, Azemichi with writing comedy and when to transition and Taiyo with performing and ad-libbing, the two decide to team up and form the comedy duo . In order to earn the blessing of Azemichi's parents, they must win the bimonthly High School Comedy Battle. There, they meet and become rivals to the duo Sprechchor and come in second place behind Rising. However, Rising resigns so that One-Way Ticket to the Top are elevated to first place and can continue comedy. Azemichi and Taiyo then enter the Kanto-2 block preliminary round of Wara-1 Koshien, or "Wara-Ko" for short, a national manzai competition for high school students.

Characters

A shy 16-year-old high school student who is obsessed with comedy ever since he failed to make his middle school crush, Mizuha, laugh at her request two years ago. She soon changed her last name and moved away. Not knowing her new name, Azemichi hopes he might be able to see her again if he becomes famous. He has already achieved some success by submitting jokes to TV and radio shows under the name "Everyday Shijimi", but that was anonymously because he has stage fright.

Azemichi's schoolmate and a former famous child actor in historical dramas. Although a natural, he only acted to make his mother smile, and switched to comedy after seeing someone make her laugh at a joke. He was in a previous comedy duo, but his partner Sakutaro Kunugi died from a disease. Carrying on his former partner's dream, he wants to become the first person to win both the Wara-1 Grand Prix, a competition for manzai duos, and the Ultimate Comedy Battle, a sketch comedy competition.

Azemichi and Taiyo's senpai who has been a big fan of comedy since she was a child. She is One-Way Ticket to the Top's biggest fan and trains them in manzai, while becoming something of a manager to them.

As three-time finalists of Wara-1 Koshien, and with the most appearances at the High School Comedy Battle, they are the "most visible" high school manzai duo. They form a friendly rivalry with One-Way Ticket to the Top after meeting at the High School Comedy Battle.

A cocky, new comedy duo who beat One-Way Ticket to the Top at the High School Comedy Battle, their first competition. However, they resign so that One-Way Ticket to the Top win and Azemichi's parents can not force them to give up comedy.

One-half of the comedy duo . He was previously in the duo Selinentius with Sakutaro Kunugi, before Kunugi left to team up with Taiyo. He holds a grudge against Taiyo for "stealing" his partner.

Their comedy is atypical in manzai in that it revolves around physical slapstick where Kanade strikes Tabata.

Publication
Written by Akinari Asakura and illustrated by Takeshi Obata, Show-ha Shoten! began monthly serialization in Jump Squares November 2021 issue, which was released on October 4, 2021. Publisher Shueisha is collecting the individual chapters into tankōbon volumes, with the first released on January 4, 2022. Both Shueisha and Viz Media are releasing the series in English the same day it is published in Japan, the former on its Manga Plus website and application. In June 2022, Viz Media announced that they would begin releasing volumes in Spring 2023.

Volume list

Chapters not yet in tankōbon format
These chapters have yet to be published in a tankōbon volume. They were serialized in Jump Square.

Reception
Danny Guan of GameRant included Show-ha Shoten! on a list of the "Best Shonen Manga of 2021". Antonio Mireles of The Fandom Post praised the teamwork between Azemichi and Taiyo as they work around each other's strengths and weaknesses, writing that the series plays to Obata's strengths by them being similar to the two protagonists of his earlier manga, Bakuman. Although he said the jokes start off strong and commended the English translator for going to great effort to make sure their meanings were not lost in translation, Mireles felt that the comedy "seams begin to rip apart" in the second chapter. He finished with, "The world needs a good laugh and Show-Ha Shoten! Is about to provide it to the world." Real Sound'''s Fujimoto also felt the "high school buddy" relationship was reminiscent of Bakuman, and praised Obata's art. He recommended the series to those who want to understand the structure of owarai.

In a review for Multiversity Comics, Brian Salvatore wrote that at its heart, Show-ha Shoten!'' is a sports manga about something other than a sport and stated "comedy is handled as something that can be mastered if worked out enough [...] And while that is certainly true to a degree, it is a lot harder to show someone mastering timing or the art of writing a great sketch than it is to show someone attempting to break off a curveball." Citing the comedy routines as the worst part about the series, Salvatore explained that they have so much working against them; the "non-comedic commentary on comedy concept", a language barrier, and trying to write out text for a physical performance that also serves the plot and is not just a standalone skit. Overall, he called the first two chapters a good start to a story that suffers from trying to explain comedy.

Notes

References

External links
 Show-ha Shoten! on the Official Shueisha website 
 Show-ha Shoten! on Manga Plus
 Show-ha Shoten! on the Official Viz website
 

Comedy anime and manga
School life in anime and manga
Shōnen manga
Shueisha manga
Slice of life anime and manga
Takeshi Obata
Viz Media manga
Works about comedians